Rosa Muchnik de Lederkremer (born 12 January 1932) is an Argentine chemist. A doctor in chemical sciences, emeritus professor at the University of Buenos Aires (UBA), and senior researcher at the National Scientific and Technical Research Council (CONICET), she has received Konex Awards in the area of Organic Chemistry in 1983 and 2013. Her research includes major contributions in the area of glycobiology through investigating the inhibition of the key enzyme for the survival of Trypanosoma cruzi in the human body.

Biography
Rosa Muchnik was born in Buenos Aires on 12 January 1932, the daughter of Jewish immigrants from Ukraine, who had to flee their homeland because of pogroms and the rise of antisemitism in Europe. She is the firstborn of four siblings. When her father arrived in Argentina, he first settled in the town of Pigüé, and shortly after saving money, he settled in Buenos Aires, where he met her mother.

Rosa Muchnik was married to Gerardo Lederkremer from 1960 until his death in 2018.

Career
Muchnik earned a licentiate in chemical sciences from the UBA Faculty of Exact and Natural Sciences (UBA-FCEN) in 1954, and a doctorate in organic chemistry there in 1956.

She became the first female professor of the Organic Chemistry Department (DQO UBA-FCEN) in 1967. She later served as its director from 1995 to 1999. She was the main impetus for the creation of CONICET's Carbohydrate Research Center, and was its first director from 1995 to 2000.

Memberships
 Argentine Chemical Association
 American Chemical Society, Divisions of Carbohydrate Chemistry and Organic Chemistry
 Argentine Society for Biochemical Research (SAIB)
 Argentine Society for Research in Organic Chemistry (SAIQO)
 Protozoology Society
 Society for Glycobiology
 Brazilian Academy of Sciences

Awards and distinctions
 1983: Konex Merit Diploma in Organic Chemistry
 2000: Dr. Venancio Deulofeu Award, Argentine Chemical Association
 2003: Bernardo Houssay Career Award
 2008: Consecration Award from the National Academy of Exact and Natural Sciences
 2013: Konex Platinum Award

References

External links
 Rosa Muchnik de Lederkremer at the UBA Department of Organic Chemistry

1932 births
21st-century Argentine women scientists
Argentine biochemists
Living people
University of Buenos Aires alumni
Academic staff of the University of Buenos Aires